MNT may stand for:

/mnt in Unix, directory including mount points
Medical nutrition therapy
MNT (gene), a transcription factor
Molecular nanotechnology
Mongolian tögrög, the currency of Mongolia by ISO 4217 currency code
Mononitrotoluene, or meta-nitrotoluene
MyNetworkTV, a television broadcast syndication service 
Montserrat, by IAAF country code
11β-Methyl-19-nortestosterone, an anabolic-androgenic steroid
Maleonitriledithiolate, an anion found in compounds such as sodium maleonitriledithiolate